Petr Bříza (born December 9, 1964) is a Czech former professional ice hockey goaltender. He played in goal on the bronze medal-winning Czechoslovak national team at the 1992 Winter Olympics.

Awards
 Urpo Ylönen trophy for best goaltender in SM-liiga – 1992

External links
 
 Petr Briza personal website

1964 births
Living people
Czech ice hockey goaltenders
Czechoslovak ice hockey goaltenders
EV Landshut players
HC Sparta Praha players
HC Dukla Jihlava players
Ice hockey people from Prague
Ice hockey players at the 1988 Winter Olympics
Ice hockey players at the 1992 Winter Olympics
Ice hockey players at the 1994 Winter Olympics
Lukko players
Medalists at the 1992 Winter Olympics
Motor České Budějovice players
Olympic bronze medalists for Czechoslovakia
Olympic ice hockey players of Czechoslovakia
Olympic ice hockey players of the Czech Republic
Olympic medalists in ice hockey
Czech expatriate ice hockey players in Finland
Czech expatriate ice hockey players in Germany
Czechoslovak expatriate sportspeople in Finland
Czechoslovak expatriate ice hockey people